Eritreans in the United Kingdom are an ethnic group that consist of Eritrean immigrants to the United Kingdom as well as their descendants.

The 2001 Census recorded 6,561 Eritrean-born people residing in the UK. According to the 2011 UK Census, there were 16,921 Eritrean-born residents in England, 361 in Wales, 399 in Scotland, and 24 in Northern Ireland. Of this total of 17,705 Eritrean-born residents, 10,198 lived in Greater London, 1,977 in the West Midlands, 1,901 in Yorkshire and the Humber and 1,249 in North West England. The Office for National Statistics estimates that the Eritrean-born population was 31,000 in 2018.

Many Eritreans arrive in the United Kingdom as refugees; between 2006 and 2008 and in 2014, Britain received more Eritrean asylum-seekers than any other nationality.

Notable individuals

References

External links
Medhani Alem Eritrean Orthodox Church, Manchester, Facebook page

 

British people of Eritrean descent
African diaspora in the United Kingdom
United Kingdom
Immigration to the United Kingdom by country of origin